Richard John "Dick" Aggiss AM is a former Australia men's national field hockey team coach.

Aggiss was Head Coach of the Australia men's national field hockey team from 1981 to 1988 and the inaugural Head Men's Coach of Australian Institute of Sport hockey program from 1984 to 1994. During this period results in major competitions were:
1982: 2nd - Champions Trophy
1983: 3rd - World Cup ; 1st - Champions Trophy
1984: 4th - Los Angeles Olympic Games
1985: 1st - Champions Trophy
1986: 1st - World Cup ; 2nd - Champions Trophy
1987: 3rd - Champions Trophy
1988: 4th  - Seoul Olympic Games ; 3rd - Champions Trophy

Aggiss has held several board positions. In 1998, he became a member of  Australian Hockey Association (men), remained involved on the Board once the men’s and women’s associations amalgamated in 2000 to become Hockey Australia and served as vice president until 2006.  He was a member of the Western Australian Institute of Sport Board from 1994 to 1999.

Recognition
 1984 - International Hockey Federation World Coach 
 1987 - Coach of the Year Australian Sport Awards
 1988 - Member of the Order of Australia (AM) for his service to of service to the sport of hockey. 
 2000 - Australian Sports Medal
 2001 - Centenary Medal

References

Australian field hockey coaches
Australian Institute of Sport coaches
Australian Olympic coaches
Living people
Year of birth missing (living people)